Adams–Nance syndrome is a medical condition consisting of persistent tachycardia, paroxysmal hypertension and seizures. It is associated with hyperglycinuria, dominantly inherited microphthalmia and cataracts. It is thought to be caused by a disturbance in glycine metabolism.

References

External links
 

Syndromes affecting the heart
Diseases named for discoverer